Gemmula monilifera is a species of sea snail, a marine gastropod mollusk in the family Turridae, the turrids.

Description
The length of the shell varies between 10 mm and 30 mm.

Distribution

References

 Pease, W.H. 1861. Descriptions of seventeen new species of marine shells from the Sandwich Islands, in the collection of Hugh Cuming. Proceedings of the Zoological Society of London 28: 397-400
 Weinkauff, H.C. 1875. Ueber eine kritische gruppe des genus Pleurotoma Lam. sensu stricto. Jahrbücher der Deutschen Malakozoologischen Gesellschaft 1875: 285–292 
 Paetel 1887. Catalog der Conchylien-Sammlung. I. Die Cephalopoden, Pteropoden und Meeres-Gastropoden. Berlin, Verlag von Gerbrüder Paetel. Berlin : Verlag von Gerbrüder Paetel pp. 1-16, 1-639.
 Iredale, T. 1931. Australian molluscan notes. No. 1. Records of the Australian Museum 18(4): 201–235, pls xxii–xxv 
 Tinker (1952), Pacific Sea Shells, p. 46, p1. 1; A handbook of common marine mollusks of Hawaii and the south seas. Tokyo : Tuttle 240 pp.
 Powell, A.W.B. 1964. The Family Turridae in the Indo-Pacific. Part 1. The Subfamily Turrinae. Indo-Pacific Mollusca 1: 227-346
 Kosuge, S. 1990. Report on the family Turridae collected along the north-western coast of Australia. Bulletin of the Institute of Malacology, Tokyo 2(9): 149-156, pls 54, 55 
 Steyn, D.G. & Lussi, M. (1998) Marine Shells of South Africa. An Illustrated Collector's Guide to Beached Shells. Ekogilde Publishers, Hartebeespoort, South Africa, ii + 264 pp

External links
  Tucker, J.K. 2004 Catalog of recent and fossil turrids (Mollusca: Gastropoda). Zootaxa 682:1-1295.

monilifera
Gastropods described in 1860